The Women's JAL Super Hayago was a Go competition.

Outline
The Women's JAL Super Hayago was sponsored by Japan Airlines. The winner's purse was 2,500,000 Yen ($23,000).

Past winners

Go competitions in Japan